Paterson School District can refer to:

Paterson School District (Washington)
Paterson Public Schools (Paterson, New Jersey)